The Women's giant slalom competition of the 1960 Winter Olympics was held at Squaw Valley on Tuesday, February 23.

The defending world champion was Lucile Wheeler of Canada,
who had retired from international competition.

Yvonne Rüegg of Switzerland edged Penny Pitou of the United States by a tenth of a second, the smallest margin at the time.

Results

References 

Women's giant slalom
Oly
Alp